Peramium is a village and a panchayat near Dharapuram and Mulanur in Tirupur district in the state of Tamil Nadu, India.

History

Peramium stands on the banks of the holy river Amaravati, a tributary of the Kaveri River.

Every year in January [The month of Thai in Tamil year] 'Thai Pusam' festival for Maakaali Amman temple celebrating by the devotees. Every year Kamachi Amman temple, Bajanai mada temple festival is celebrated by the devotees.

Dharapuram was under the regimes of Chera kings in 850 A.D. Thereafter (in 1000 A.D. – 1275 A.D.) this place came under the rule of Cholas with Dharapuram as their Headquarters. Subsequently, it came under the control of Padiars (from 1276 A.D.). Only during this period, a ruler by name Veerapandian caused the digging of Kalingarayan Channel. Then the Muslims (Sultans) took over the rule after which Nayaks of Madurai ruled. Then Hyder Ali and Tippu Sultan held sway.

In 1799 when Tippu fell to the British, the East Indian Company took over the administration. It is famous for its Aanjaneya temple. In ancient times Dharapuram was called 'Viradapura' which has significant links to Mahabharat.

Demographics 
Peramium has population of 2,899 of which 1,471 are males while 1,428 are females as per report released by Census India 2011.  Literacy rate of Peramium is 61.50% lower than state average of 80.09%.

Geography
Peramium is located 64 km towards East from the district headquarters Tirupur .

Schools
 Government High School, Peramium.

Temples
The following temples are in Peramium:

Maakaali amman Temple
Bagavathi amman Temple
Eswaran Temple (Ootai Pillayar kovil)
Ezhuvaramman Temple
Kamachi amman Temple
Bajanai madam Temple

There were many temples near to Peramium. 
         
Annanmar alayam Temple
Pandudhagara samy Temple
Varadharaja Perumal Temple
Periyanayagi Amman Temple
Aruvasamy Temple
Neelampur Kaliamman Temple

Economy
Agriculture
Rice Mills
Poultry

Transport
Peramium is 15 km from Dharapuram, 11 km from Mulanur and 22 km from Vellakovil.
Govt Buses are available from Dharapuram, Mulanur and Vellakovil.

References

External links
 Peramium - Wikimapia Map
 Tiruppur District - Dharapuram Taluk - Revenue Village - Peramium
   e-Services of Government of Tamil Nadu - view the Patta Copy (Chitta Extract)
 Census 2011 Hand Book -Village Amenities in the State of Tamil Nadu

Villages in Tiruppur district